Werner Christoph (born 13 January 1943) was an East German sailor, born in Berlin, who competed in the 1968 Summer Olympics and in the 1972 Summer Olympics.

References

1943 births
Living people
Sportspeople from Berlin
East German male sailors (sport)
Olympic sailors of East Germany
German male sailors (sport)
Sailors at the 1968 Summer Olympics – Flying Dutchman
Sailors at the 1972 Summer Olympics – Soling
European Champions Soling